Figure skating at the 2003 European Youth Olympic Winter Festival were held in Bled, Slovenia between January 25 and 31, 2003. Skaters comped in the disciplines of men's singles, ladies' singles, pair skating, and Ice dancing.

Results

Men

Ladies

Pairs

Ice dance

External links
 results

European Youth Olympic Festival
Figure skating
International figure skating competitions hosted by Slovenia
Sport in Bled